Janet L. Folger Porter (born October 13, 1962) is an American anti-abortion activist and author.

Biography
Porter founded the now defunct website ReaganBook, and in 2003 the conservative Christian ministry Faith2Action. Porter is most known promoting the anti-abortion movement and anti-LGBT activism. She is also an outspoken conservative Christian. In 2018, the Southern Poverty Law Center designated Faith2Action as a hate group for its anti-LGBT stance. Janet Porter believes homosexuality is a choice. She stated gay marriage caused Noah’s floods and was significant in developing a 1990s gay conversion campaign. The Guardian wrote, "The 1998 campaign claimed "former homosexuals" could convert to heterosexuality after attending 'ex-gay ministries.' Porter called it Truth in Love.' Recognizing the harm such programs can cause, gay conversion therapy is now illegal in many states, including parts of Florida and Ohio."

In 2017, she served as a spokesperson for Roy Moore in his campaign for the United States Senate special election in Alabama, 2017, drawing media attention for repeatedly refusing to answer direct questions about the candidate's publicly stated beliefs.

From 1997 to 2002, she was the National Director of the Center for Reclaiming America and an Ohio Right to Life legislative director. Porter has also worked on campaigns supporting George W. Bush for president and Mike Huckabee for president.

Anti-abortion activism
Porter's efforts supporting the passing of six-week abortion bans (called "heartbeat bills" by their proponents) in American state legislatures has led to her being described as "in many ways the godmother of the heartbeat movement." Prior to founding Faith2Action in 2003, she was the legislative director for Ohio Right to Life from 1988 to 1997. At Ohio Right to Life, she helped lobby for the first partial-birth abortion ban in the United States, which was later upheld by the Supreme Court in Gonzales v. Carhart. She then served as the national director of the Center for Reclaiming America from September 1997 to 2002. She has said that she joined the center because she wanted to focus on more issues than just abortion. At the Center, she led a campaign promoting the idea that homosexuality is an individual choice.

The original Ohio "Heartbeat Bill" (House Bill 493) was authored by Porter, who launched the first version of it in Ohio in 2011, and advocated for its passing; former Governor John Kasich then vetoed it twice, prior to its passing in 2019. In 2011, she played "testimony" from a fetus in legislative hearings on the bill, by projecting an ultrasound image onto a screen and showing it to legislators.

Introduced in 11 states, and passed by legislatures in four more, Porter’s bill is supported by conservatives seeking to mount a challenge to Roe v. Wade.

Faith2Action radio show
Porter previously hosted a radio show, also called Faith2Action, before it was cancelled in 2010. VCY America, the show's parent company, said it cancelled the show because Porter had expressed views too similar to dominion theology. The following week, she posted a blog post denying that she supported dominion theology.

Political candidacy
In 2016, Porter ran unsuccessfully against Larry Obhof in the Republican primary for the Ohio Senate's 22nd district. During her candidacy, she criticized Republican opponents for not supporting six-week abortion bans. Her campaign for Obhof's senate seat was supported by Mike Huckabee. In a February 2016 video, Huckabee announced that he was supporting Porter because she would fight "for faith, family, and freedom." In 2022, Porter ran for the Republican nomination in Ohio's 13th congressional district, ultimately finishing third in the May 3 primary, behind winner Madison Gesiotto and runner-up Gregory Wheeler.

Website to decertify 2020 presidential election
Porter is one of the principals behind a website that encourages citizens to send postcards to five key states to “decertify fraud” in the 2020 presidential election and charges up to $100 to do so. Those five states—Arizona, Georgia, Pennsylvania, Wisconsin, and Michigan, were won by Joe Biden in the election. There is no legal process to do such decertification, and the non-partisan fact-checking website PolitiFact rated the claims to the contrary "Pants on Fire." A Facebook post by Porter promoting the website was flagged as part of Facebook’s efforts to combat false news and misinformation on its News Feed.

Author
Porter is the author of several books published by Random House, including True to Life and The Criminalization of Christianity.

She has authored a column for WorldNetDaily since 2007, in which she has promoted conspiracy theories about Barack Obama, including that he is not a U.S. citizen.

References

External links

American anti-abortion activists
Place of birth missing (living people)
American radio hosts
Christians from Ohio
Ohio Republicans
1962 births
Living people
American women radio presenters
21st-century American women
Activists from Ohio
Conversion therapy practitioners
Candidates in the 2022 United States House of Representatives elections